Matti Valkonen (5 August 1880 – 10 October 1952) was a Finnish schoolteacher, farmer and politician. He was a Member of the Parliament of Finland from 1919 to 1922, representing the National Progressive Party.

References

1880 births
1952 deaths
People from Priozersky District
People from Viipuri Province (Grand Duchy of Finland)
National Progressive Party (Finland) politicians
Members of the Parliament of Finland (1919–22)